Archibald MacKechnie Baird (8 May 1919 – 3 November 2009) was a Scottish footballer, who played for Aberdeen and St Johnstone. He was also capped once by the Scotland national football team.

Playing career
Baird was born in Rutherglen. Having played for local Junior clubs in the area, he signed for Aberdeen before the Second World War (along with Willie Waddell, although it was the other player of the same name who had been his teammate at Strathclyde), but the war started before he had made the first team. He joined the British Army, but was captured and held as a prisoner of war. He escaped and lived with an Italian family as their "son". In 1989, he published an autobiography, Family of Four, which described these experiences.

Baird returned to Aberdeen before the end of the war. His good form in this period earned him selection for Scotland in a friendly match against Belgium in early 1946. Baird was one of nine Scotland players making their international debut in the match, with only Jimmy Delaney having significant experience. Of those nine debutants, five players did not make another international appearance, including Baird.

Baird helped Aberdeen win the Southern League Cup (a forerunner of the Scottish League Cup) in 1946 and the 1947 Scottish Cup, but his appearances were restricted by injuries. In all he made 104 league appearances for Aberdeen, scoring 26 goals in those matches. He was transferred in 1953 to St Johnstone, where he played for three seasons before retiring in 1956.

Later life and family
After retiring as a player, Baird worked as a teacher and a sports journalist. His sister, journalist Mamie Baird, married TV broadcaster Magnus Magnusson; Archie is the uncle of their children, TV producer Jon Magnusson and TV news presenter Sally Magnusson.

Baird celebrated his 90th birthday in May 2009, at which point he was Aberdeen's oldest living former player; he died quietly in his sleep on 3 November 2009.

Bibliography

References

External links 
 
 London Hearts profile
 
 
 AFC Heritage profile

1919 births
2009 deaths
Aberdeen F.C. players
Rutherglen Glencairn F.C. players
Strathclyde F.C. players
Leeds United F.C. wartime guest players
British Army personnel of World War II
British World War II prisoners of war
Scottish military personnel
Association football utility players
Sportspeople from Rutherglen
People educated at Rutherglen Academy
Scotland international footballers
Scottish Football League players
Scottish Junior Football Association players
Scottish footballers
St Johnstone F.C. players
World War II prisoners of war held by Italy
Association football inside forwards
Scottish escapees
Escapees from Italian detention
Footballers from South Lanarkshire